Joseph Dillon (born January 25, 1992) is an American soccer player.

Career

College and amateur
Dillon played four years of college soccer at Georgetown University between 2010 and 2013. While at college, Dillon also appeared for USL PDL club Michigan Bucks and NPSL club Detroit City FC.

Professional career
Dillon was drafted 53rd overall by Real Salt Lake in the 2014 MLS SuperDraft. Dillon was signed by the club on March 1, 2014.

Dillon signed with USL Pro club Arizona United in April 2014.

References

1992 births
Living people
American soccer players
Association football midfielders
Detroit City FC players
Georgetown Hoyas men's soccer players
Flint City Bucks players
National Premier Soccer League players
People from Rochester Hills, Michigan
Phoenix Rising FC players
Real Salt Lake draft picks
Real Salt Lake players
Soccer players from Michigan
USL Championship players
USL League Two players